The Sisters of Charity were founded at Besançon in France, in 1799, by a Vincentian Sister, Jeanne Antide Thouret.

Description
The mother house, originally at Naples, was later moved to Rome, and there were filial establishments in Italy, in Malta, and Gozo. The sisters were in charge of schools, orphanages, hospitals, and insane asylums.

See also
Sisters of Charity

References

Attribution

Religious organizations established in 1799
Catholic female orders and societies
Catholic religious institutes established in the 18th century

ar:راهبات المحبة (البيزنسون)